The Crossing the Lines project brings the communities of Utrecht (the Netherlands) and Mortsel (Belgium) and the County of Essex (Great Britain) together to protect and redevelop flood defencelines in Northwest Europe in an environmentally sustainable manner.

This partnership will develop the defence lines of "Nieuwe Hollandse Waterlinie" (Utrecht), the east coast of the UK (Essex) and "Vesting Antwerpen" (Mortsel).

External links
Crossing the lines

Flood control projects
Coastal Essex
Mortsel
Utrecht (city)